The Columbia Savings LPGA National Pro-Am was a golf tournament on the LPGA Tour from 1972 to 1987. It was played at several clubs in the Denver, Colorado area. From 1985 to 1987, the tournament was played on two courses.

Tournament locations

Winners
Columbia Savings LPGA National Pro-Am
 1987 Christa Johnson

LPGA National Pro-Am
 1986 Amy Alcott
 1985 Pat Bradley

Columbia Savings Classic
 1984 Betsy King
 1983 Pat Bradley
 1982 Beth Daniel

Columbia Savings LPGA Classic
 1981 JoAnne Carner
 1980 Beth Daniel

Columbia Savings Classic
 1979 Sally Little

National Jewish Hospital Open
 1978 Kathy Whitworth
 1977 JoAnne Carner
 1976 Sandra Palmer
 1975 Judy Rankin
 1974 Sandra Haynie
 1973 Sandra Palmer
 1972 Sandra Haynie

References

Former LPGA Tour events
Recurring sporting events established in 1972
Recurring sporting events disestablished in 1987
Golf in Colorado
Sports competitions in Denver
1972 establishments in Colorado
1987 disestablishments in Colorado
History of women in Colorado